The Broxbourne Council election, 1982 was held to elect council members of the Broxbourne Borough Council, the local government authority of the borough of Broxbourne,  Hertfordshire, England.

Composition of expiring seats before election

Election results

Results summary 

An election was held in 14 wards on 6 May 1982.

The SDP-Liberal Alliance gained 1 seat from the Conservatives in Rosedale Ward.

Conservative 33 seats
Labour 7 seats
SDP-Liberal Alliance 2 seats

Ward results

References
Lea Valley Mercury Friday 14 May 1982 Edition

1982
1982 English local elections
1980s in Hertfordshire
May 1982 events in the United Kingdom